The following radio stations broadcast on AM frequency 1000 kHz:

1000 AM is a United States and Mexican clear-channel frequency. KNWN Seattle, WMVP Chicago and XEOY Mexico City share Class A status on 1000 kHz.

Argentina
LT42 Del Iberá in Mercedes, Corrientes
LU16 Rio Negro in Villa Regina, Río Negro
Sintonia in José C Paz, Buenos Aires.

Chile
CB100 at Santiago

Mexico
Stations in bold are clear-channel stations.
XECSV-AM in Coatzacoalcos, Veracruz
XEFV-AM in Ciudad Juarez, Chihuahua
XEGQ-AM in Los Reyes de Salgado, Michoacán
XEMYL-AM in Mérida, Yucatán
XEOY-AM in Mexico City - 50 kW daytime, 20 kW nighttime, transmitter located at 
XETAC-AM in El Sacrificio (Tapachula), Chiapas

United States 
Stations in bold are clear-channel stations.

References

Lists of radio stations by frequency